Akrem Ben Sassi (born 23 October 1984) is a Tunisian football defender.

References

1984 births
Living people
Tunisian footballers
Olympique Béja players
Stade Gabèsien players
Association football defenders
Tunisian Ligue Professionnelle 1 players